The LG Cup Four Nations is an exhibition association football tournament that took place in  National Stadium, Lagos, Nigeria in April 2004.

Participants
The participants were:

 (Participated only using their home-based players.)

 Senegal U-23

Results

Semifinals

Third place match

Final

Scorers
 1 goal
  U-23 Mouhamadou Traoré
  U-23 Khalifa Sankaré
  Salem Rewane
  Emeka Akwueme
  Chukwudi Nworgu

References

International association football competitions hosted by Nigeria